Gustave Remoué (25 December 1900 – 12 April 1924) was a French triple jumper. He competed at the 1920 Summer Olympics and placed 19th.

References

1900 births
1924 deaths
French male triple jumpers
Athletes (track and field) at the 1920 Summer Olympics
Olympic athletes of France